
Shipki La is a mountain pass and border post with a dozen buildings of significant size on the India-China border. The river Sutlej, which is called Langqên Zangbo in Tibet, enters India (from Tibet) near this pass.  A spur road on the Indian side rises to an altitude of  four km southwest of Shipki La.

The pass is on the border between the Kinnaur district in the state of Himachal Pradesh, India, and the Ngari Prefecture in Tibet, China. The pass is one of India's border trading points with Tibet along with Nathu La in Sikkim, and Lipulekh in Uttarakhand. The pass is close to town of Khab.

Currently the road at the pass is used only for small-scale local trade across the border.  Like other border passes along the India-Tibet border, it is not open for non-residents. Most people travelling between India and Tibet by land travel via Nepal.

Geography
Captain Robert Hamond, who travelled from Gartok to the Bashahr State via Shipki La in 1939, described his journey as follows:

Sino-Indian trade
It was suggested NH 5 could be used as a route for land access to the Arabian Sea as the Karakoram Highway is much more treacherous for transport. This opening of the border at Shipki La is claimed to potentially increase trade on both sides of the border.

See also
Nathula
Lipulekh
 Tashigang 
 India-China Border Roads 
 Line of Actual Control
 List of disputed territories of India

References

External links
Photos of the pass on Flickr

China–India border crossings
Geography of Kinnaur district
Mountain passes of Himachal Pradesh
Mountain passes of Tibet
Mountain passes of China
Mountain passes of India
Mountain passes of the Himalayas